The yellowtail sergeant (Abudefduf notatus) is a species of damselfish in the family Pomacentridae native to the Indo-Pacific.

Distribution and habitat
This species of damselfish is found in the Indo-Pacific. In the Indian Ocean, it occurs in the Gulf of Aden, the Arabian Sea, eastern Africa, Madagascar, Seychelles, the Maldives, Sri Lanka, the Andaman Sea, Indonesia, and Australia. In the Pacific Ocean, it occurs in the Gulf of Thailand, Indonesia, the Great Barrier Reef around Australia, the Philippines, Taiwan, Japan, New Caledonia, and various islands in the western Pacific Ocean. Adults live in coral reefs and lagoons while juveniles are found in the open sea.

Description
It is gray with 5 vertical black bands and a yellow caudal fin. It has 13 dorsal spines, 13 to 14 dorsal soft rays, 2 anal spines, and 13 to 14 anal soft rays.

Ecology

Behavior
Abudefduf notatus forms roving aggregations which are noted to be rather difficult to approach. It is an oviparous species, with individuals forming distinct pairs during breeding and males guarding and aerating eggs.

In the aquarium
Abudefduf notatus is found in the aquarium trade.

References

External links
 Fishes of Australia : Abudefduf notatus

notatus
Fish of the Indian Ocean
Marine fauna of East Africa
yellowtail sergeant